Hemingfold Meadow is a  biological Site of Special Scientific Interest west of Battle in East Sussex.

This site consists of two adjacent meadows which have been managed with a grazing and mowing regime which maintains the flora. More than sixty species of flowering plant have been recorded, including common spotted orchid, ox-eye daisy, cuckoo flower, pignut, yellow rattle and primrose.

References

Sites of Special Scientific Interest in East Sussex